The discography of English singer-songwriter David Bowie (1947–2016) consists of 26 studio albums, 21 live albums, 46 compilation albums, 10 extended plays, 128 singles, 3 soundtracks and 12 box sets. Bowie also released 28 video albums and 72 music videos. Throughout his lifetime, Bowie sold roughly 140 million records worldwide. In 2012, Bowie was ranked ninth best selling singles artist in United Kingdom with 10.6 million singles sold. As of January 2016, Bowie has sold 12.09 million singles in Britain. In a period of 24 months since his death, 5 million records were sold in UK, 3.1 million singles and 2 million albums.

Bowie's debut release was the 1964 single "Liza Jane" by Davie Jones & the King Bees. He released two more singles in 1965 under the names of the Manish Boys and Davy Jones & the Lower Third. His first release using the name David Bowie was the 1966 single "Can't Help Thinking About Me", which was released with the Lower Third. His next single, "Do Anything You Say", also released in 1966, was the first release by simply David Bowie. Bowie released four more singles and his debut album, David Bowie, but the first success in the United Kingdom was with the 1969 single "Space Oddity". The single reached number five on the UK Singles Chart after it was released five days before the Apollo 11 moon mission. In 1975, the single was re-released, becoming Bowie's first UK number-one single.

Bowie released three more albums – David Bowie (1969), The Man Who Sold the World (1970) and Hunky Dory (1971) – before he eventually made it on to the UK Albums Chart with The Rise and Fall of Ziggy Stardust and the Spiders from Mars (1972), which peaked at number five. Its success saw sales of Hunky Dory improve and it eventually peaked at number three in the UK in 1973. RCA re-released the 1969 David Bowie under the title Space Oddity and The Man Who Sold the World, which reached numbers 17 and 26 in the UK, respectively.

Bowie released nine more studio albums with RCA, all of which reached the top five of the UK Albums Chart; Aladdin Sane, Pin Ups (both 1973), Diamond Dogs (1974) and Scary Monsters (and Super Creeps) (1980) all reached number one. Young Americans included his first US number-one single "Fame". He then released three solo studio albums with EMI – Let's Dance (1983), whose title track became his first single to reach number one in both the UK and US, Tonight (1984) and Never Let Me Down (1987). Let's Dance and Tonight reached number one in the UK, while Never Let Me Down reached number six. The success of Let's Dance revitalised Bowie's back catalogue: throughout the summer of 1983, he had multiple albums on the UK Albums Chart. This peaked on 16 July that year, with ten entries – a figure bettered only by Elvis Presley.

From 1988 to 1992, Bowie performed as a member of the rock band Tin Machine, who released two studio albums before disbanding. Continuing as a solo artist, Black Tie White Noise (1993) reached number one on the UK Albums Chart. Despite numerous label changes throughout the decade, Bowie had further UK top ten success into the 2000s, from Outside (1995) to Reality (2003). After a ten-year hiatus, Bowie returned with The Next Day (2013), his first UK number one since Black Tie White Noise. His final album, Blackstar, was released on 8 January 2016, his 69th birthday and two days before his death on 10 January. The album debuted at number one in the UK and became his first album to reach number one on the Billboard 200 in the US. Since 2015, Parlophone has remastered Bowie's back catalogue through the "Era" box set series, starting with Five Years (1969–1973).

Studio albums

Unreleased studio albums

Re-recordings

Studio albums as a member of Tin Machine

Live albums

Official releases

TV and radio

Live albums as a member of Tin Machine

Compilation albums

1970s compilations

1980s compilations

1990s compilations

2000s compilations

2010s compilations

Box sets

David Bowie "Era" box set series

Other box sets

Soundtracks

Extended plays

Singles

1960s singles

1970s singles

1970s promotional singles

1980s singles

1990s singles

2000s singles

2010s singles

2020s singles

Singles as a member of Tin Machine

Other appearances

Studio contributions

Live contributions

Guest appearances

Remixes and alternate versions

Music videos and films

Notes

References
General

Specific

External links

David Bowie 7″ single discography
Illustrated db Discography – complete discography and collectors forum

Discographies of British artists
Discography
Rock music discographies